Erich Ahrendt (born 29 July 1933) is a German athlete. He competed in the men's javelin throw at the 1960 Summer Olympics.

References

External links
 

1933 births
Living people
Athletes (track and field) at the 1960 Summer Olympics
German male javelin throwers
Olympic athletes of the United Team of Germany
Sportspeople from Brandenburg